Molly Qerim  (born March 31, 1984) is an American television personality and a host of ESPN's First Take. She previously was the host of NFL Network's weekday morning show, NFL AM, and NFL Fantasy Live.

Early life 
Qerim was born at Yale New Haven Hospital and grew up in Cheshire, Connecticut to a Catholic mother and Muslim father.  She graduated from Cheshire High School before attending the University of Connecticut where she obtained a Bachelor of Arts in communications and a minor in business administration. She received a master's degree from Quinnipiac University in broadcast journalism.

Career

Qerim began as an anchor and reporter for the CBS Sports Network.

She was also a studio anchor, where she hosted SEC Tailgate Show, SEC Tonight, MaxPreps Lemming Report, Full Court Press and Bracket Breakdown. Qerim has also covered the UFC in her time with ESPN, Versus (which became NBCSN) and FS1. In addition to her work outside the Octagon, she has co-hosted the annual World MMA Awards.
  
In 2008, Qerim was the interactive host for College Football Live on ESPN and ESPN2. She was also the breaking news reporter for Fantasy Football Now on ESPN2 and was honored with an Emmy for her contribution to the show. Additionally, she co-hosted Campus Connection on ESPNU.
 
Qerim has been part of other digital media content, conducting interviews of various athletes and celebrities for ESPN.com and ESPN Mobile. She has covered multiple Super Bowls (hosting, reporting, and red carpet events), the Heisman Trophy presentation, the NBA draft, the NBA All-Star Game and the MLB All-Star game, providing on-site reporting and interviews. She became the interim host of ESPN2's First Take in mid-July 2015. She replaced Cari Champion, who was promoted to ESPN's flagship show, SportsCenter. She was promoted to permanent host of First Take on September 15, 2015.

Personal life 
On April 13, 2018, Qerim announced that she has severe endometriosis. On July 20, 2018, Qerim married former NBA player and fellow ESPN host Jalen Rose. In December 2021, TMZ Sports announced Rose had filed for divorce from Qerim, after being separated for about a year.

References

External links 

 

1984 births
American people of Albanian descent
American people of Italian descent
American television sports anchors
American women sportswriters
College basketball announcers in the United States
College football announcers
Disney people
ESPN people
Living people
Mixed martial arts broadcasters
National Football League announcers
People from Cheshire, Connecticut
People from New Haven, Connecticut
Quinnipiac University alumni
University of Connecticut alumni